Old Ripley Township is one of nine townships in Bond County, Illinois, USA.  As of the 2020 census, its population was 819 and it contained 356 housing units.

Geography

Cities
 Old Ripley
 Pocahontas (north edge)

Cemeteries
The township contains these seven cemeteries: Brown, File, Mitchell, Mount Nebo Old, New Mount Nebo, Robinson and Sugg Number 1.

Major highways
  Interstate 70
  Illinois State Route 140

Airports and landing strips
 Nance Airport

Demographics
As of the 2020 census there were 819 people, 366 households, and 258 families residing in the township. The racial makeup of the township was 96.70% White, 0.61% African American, 0.00% Native American, 0.00% Asian, 0.00% Pacific Islander, 0.24% from other races, and 2.44% from two or more races. Hispanic or Latino of any race were 0.49% of the population.

There were 366 households, out of which 38.50% had children under the age of 18 living with them, 68.58% were married couples living together, none had a female householder with no spouse present, and 29.51% were non-families. 26.80% of all households were made up of individuals, and 20.20% had someone living alone who was 65 years of age or older. The average household size was 3.22 and the average family size was 4.10.

The township's age distribution consisted of 33.5% under the age of 18, 7.5% from 18 to 24, 24.9% from 25 to 44, 22.7% from 45 to 64, and 11.5% who were 65 years of age or older. The median age was 30.4 years. For every 100 females, there were 82.5 males. For every 100 females age 18 and over, there were 85.3 males.

The median income for a household in the township was $81,250, and the median income for a family was $106,354. Males had a median income of $41,518 versus $29,063 for females. The per capita income for the township was $27,136. No families and 0.8% of the population were below the poverty line, including none of those under age 18 and none of those age 65 or over.

School districts
 Bond County Community Unit School District 2
 Highland Community Unit School District 5

Political districts
 Illinois' 19th congressional district
 State House District 102
 State Senate District 51

References
 
 United States Census Bureau 2007 TIGER/Line Shapefiles
 United States National Atlas

External links
 City-Data.com
 Illinois State Archives

Townships in Bond County, Illinois
1888 establishments in Illinois
Townships in Illinois